Trimeresurus honsonensis (also known as the Hon Son pit viper) is a species of pit viper found in southern Vietnam.

References 

honsonensis